Lisa Williams (born 1966) is an American poet.

Life
She is from Nashville, Tennessee. She graduated from Belmont University, from the University of Virginia, with an M.F.A. and from the University of Cincinnati, with an M.A.

She is an associate professor of English at Centre College.

Her work has appeared in The Southwest Review, Poetry, Raritan, The Cincinnati Review, Virginia Quarterly Review, Poetry Daily, and The Hollins Critic.

Awards
 2007 Barnard Women Poets Prize, for Woman Reading to the Sea, selected by Joyce Carol Oates
 May Swenson Poetry Award, for The Hammered Dulcimer
 2004 Rome Prize in Literature by the American Academy of Arts and Letters

Works
 "Geometry"; "Farthest Flame", The Anthony Hecht Poetry Prize 2006

Anthologies

References

External links
 Audio: Lisa Williams reads 'Geometry' from Woman Reading to the Sea: Poems
 Audio: Lisa Williams reads 'Jellyfish' from Woman Reading to the Sea: Poems

Living people
Belmont University alumni
University of Virginia alumni
University of Cincinnati alumni
1966 births
Centre College faculty
American women poets
Kentucky women writers
21st-century American poets
American women academics
21st-century American women writers